The Monroe County School District is a public school district in Monroe County, Georgia, based in Forsyth. It serves the communities of Bolingbroke, Culloden, Forsyth, Juliette, and Smarr.

All portions of the county are in the district.

Schools
The Monroe County School District has three elementary schools, one middle school, and one high school.

Elementary schools
Samuel E. Hubbard Elementary School
T.G. Scott Elementary School
Katherine B. Sutton Elementary School

Middle schools
Monroe County Middle School

High school
Mary Persons High School

References

External links

School districts in Georgia (U.S. state)
Education in Monroe County, Georgia